FK Šumadija Aranđelovac is a football club based in the town of Aranđelovac, Serbia.  It was founded in 1929.  The club competed in the East Division of the Yugoslav Second League from 1971–72 to 1979–80 season. On two occasions they have reached the closing stages of the Yugoslav Cup. In 1973 they were eliminated in the second round by Radnički Niš and in the 1975–76 season they lost in quarter-finals to eventual winners Hajduk Split. The team is currently competing in the Serbian League West, third tier competition in the Serbian football league system.

Notable players
List of former FK Šumadija Aranđelovac players with national team appearances:
 Dodë Tahiri
 Nenad Mladenović
 Goran Pandurović
 Nassor Hamoud

References

External links
 FK Šumadija Aranđelovac at srbijasport.net

Association football clubs established in 1929
Football clubs in Serbia
1929 establishments in Serbia